Eremias kavirensis (commonly known as the Maranjaab racerunner) is a large Eremias lizard known only from Kavir National Park, Iran. There are dark brown spots on the head that are larger on the posterior head scales. The dorsal side of the limbs has enlarged light spots that, on the tibia especially, merge into semi-transverse stripes.

References

Eremias
Endemic fauna of Iran
Reptiles described in 2007
Taxa named by Omid Mozaffari
Taxa named by James F. Parham